13 Carat Diamond and Other Stories is a collection of short stories by Khin Myo Chit.  It was published in 1969, with a second edition released in October 2005. The collection contains glimpses of the author's life and the culture of Burma, as well as fiction.

The title story, The 13 Carat Diamond, first appeared in The Guardian magazine in 1955, and was later included in 50 Great Oriental Stories, published by Bantam Classics.  The story describes the author's own experiences in war-time Burma.

The anthology includes the stories:
 The 13-Carat Diamond
 Home-Coming
 The Golden Princess
 Electra Triumphs
 The Ruse
 The Bearer of the Betel Casket
 The Egg and I
 I Believe in Miracles
 Of Mice and Men
 Sweet Airs that Give Delight
 Fortune-Telling is Fun
 The Late Princess Mindat
 Why Writers Write
 A Writer's Prayer
 The Man Who Twirls His Beard
 Chit Pe the Lunatic and Money
 Till the Hair Rots and Falls to the Ground

External links
ayinepan.com catalogue page
myanmarbookshop.com page
Sample pages of the book can be viewed at Google Books

1969 short story collections
Burmese short story collections
Short stories set in Myanmar